Haselünne is a town in Lower Saxony, Germany, in the district of Emsland. It is situated on the river Hase, approx. 15 km east of Meppen.

Notable people

Notable people born in the city 
 Anton C. R. Dreesmann (1854–1934), co-founder of the Vroom & Dreesmann department store.
 Friedrich Berentzen (1928–2009), entrepreneur (Berentzen).
 Said Bahaji (born 1975), alleged Islamic terrorist and presumed member of the Hamburg terror cell who participated in the terrorist attacks on 11 September 2001.
 Jens Robben (born 1983), soccer player.

Notable residents 
 Dodo zu Innhausen und Knyphausen (1583–1636), commander in the Thirty Years War, died on January 1, 1636, in the Battle of Haselünne.

References

Towns in Lower Saxony
Emsland
Members of the Hanseatic League